{{Taxobox
| regnum = Bacteria
| phylum = Actinomycetota
| classis = Actinomycetia
| ordo = Streptosporangiales
| familia = Streptosporangiaceae
| genus = Microbispora
| genus_authority = Nonomura and Ohara 1957
| type_species = Microbispora rosea
| subdivision_ranks = Species
| subdivision = M. bryophytorumM. corallinaM. hainanensis  M. mesophilaM. rosea M. siamensisM. thailandensis}}Microbispora'' is a Gram-positive, mesophilic, thermophilic and non-motile bacterial genus from the family of Streptosporangiaceae.

References

Further reading 
 

Actinomycetales
Bacteria genera
Thermophiles